Plodosovkhoz is a rural locality (a settlement) in Volchikhinsky Selsoviet, Volchikhinsky District, Altai Krai, Russia. The population was 148 as of 2013. There are 3 streets.

Geography 
Plodosovkhoz is located 6 km southwest of Volchikha (the district's administrative centre) by road. Volchikha is the nearest rural locality.

References 

Rural localities in Volchikhinsky District